Mary Habsch (born ) is a Belgian female painter and printmaker.

Biography 
Mary Habsch was born in 1931 in Welkenraedt in the Province of Liège, Belgium.

From 1950 to 1959, she studied under Léon Devos at the Académie Royale des Beaux-Arts and graduated with a Master's Degree and Grand Distinction from the Higher Course of Painting after Nature and Composition.

Work

Her work includes many portraits, esoteric landscapes, compositions of religious or biblical inspiration, but also large scenes paying tribute to the Belgian folklore. 

Mary Habsch participated in many artists' collectives, such as: The Royal Association of Professional Artists of Belgium (since 1973), the Gryday group (since 1977), The Association of Artists of the Commune of Forest (Brussels), The Friends of Thomas Owen, The Association "Les Amis du ça m'dit" (1996-1998), The Federation of Woman Artists of Belgium.

References 

1931 births
Living people
Académie Royale des Beaux-Arts alumni
Belgian printmakers
20th-century Belgian painters